Sarıkaya is a town and district of Yozgat Province in the Central Anatolia region of Turkey. According to 2000 census, population of the district is 58,026 of which 22,102 live in the town of Sarıkaya. It is known for its hot springs and the associated bathhouses.

Sarıkaya's Ottoman-era name was Terzili and known locally as Terzilihamam due to its bathhouses (hamam). The town is currently known for its UNESCO submitted Roman-era bath named Basilica Therma that is preserved and easily visible in the town center.

Notes

References

External links
 District governor's official website 
 District municipality's official website 
 General information on Sarıkaya 

Populated places in Yozgat Province
Districts of Yozgat Province